Lorraine Rogers is a former Chairwoman of Tranmere Rovers F.C.

She is also a member of the Football League board.

Lorraine Rogers is the niece of Alan Rogers, a well travelled football manager who enjoyed success in Iran and Cyprus during his career.

References

1963 births
People from Liverpool
Living people